Designer is the third studio album by New Zealand singer-songwriter Aldous Harding, released on 26 April 2019 by 4AD. The song "The Barrel" won the 2019 APRA Silver Scroll award.

Accolades

Track listing

Personnel
Aldous Harding - vocals, acoustic and classical guitar
John Parish - acoustic and electric guitar, piano, organ, mellotron, drums, congas, percussion, mixing
H. Hawkline - bass guitar, electric guitar, synthesizer, vocal percussion, design, layout
Gwion Llewelyn - drums, vocals
Stephen Black - tenor, baritone and alto saxophone, clarinet, bass clarinet
Clare Mactaggart - violin
Jared Samuel - celesta on "Damn"

Charts

References

External links 
 Aldous Harding performs live with 6 album songs & interview, Morning Becomes Eclectic, May 9, 2019, KCRW

2019 albums
Aldous Harding albums
4AD albums
Albums produced by John Parish
albums recorded at Rockfield Studios